Hitts & Mrs. (2004) is the second novel by Emmy-winning author Lori Bryant-Woolridge. It made the Essence Magazine bestseller list. Hitts & Mrs. built on the positive reviews and sales figures for Bryant-Woolridge's first book, Read Between the Lies.

Edition

HarperCollins Trade Paperback (January 2004), 367pp., .

References

2004 novels
HarperCollins books